The Bandolero is a lost 1924 American drama film starring Pedro de Cordoba, Gustav von Seyffertitz, and Renée Adorée and directed by Tom Terriss. The screenplay is by Tom Terriss based on a novel by Paul Gwynne.

Synopsis
Manuel Granado rediscovers a son he thought had died years before to see him engaged to the daughter of the bandit who had kidnapped the son and turned him into a matador.

Cast
 Pedro de Cordoba as Dorando (The Bandolero)
 Gustav von Seyffertitz as Marques de Bazan
 Renée Adorée as Petra
 Gordon Begg as Padre Domingo
 Paul Ellis as Ramon
 Arthur Donaldson as Juan
 José de Rueda as El Tuerte
 Dorothy Rush – Concha
 Marie Valray – Maria
 Manuel Renaldo Granado

References

External links

Stills at silenthollywood.com

1924 films
American silent feature films
American black-and-white films
Metro-Goldwyn-Mayer films
1924 drama films
Silent American drama films
Lost American films
1924 lost films
Lost drama films
Films directed by Tom Terriss
1920s American films